Tegostoma anaemica is a moth in the family Crambidae. It was described by George Hampson in 1913. It is found in Pakistan.

References

Odontiini
Moths described in 1913
Moths of Asia
Taxa named by George Hampson